Lena Carlzon-Lundbäck, born 26 March 1954 in Malmberget, Sweden is a Swedish former cross-country skier, competing for Malmbergets AIF at club level. She also represented Sweden during the 1976 Olympic Winter Games in Innsbruck and in 1980 in Lake Placid, participating both in individual events and relays. Her best individual result was being part of the Swedish fourth-placed relay team in 1976, while her best individual result is two 10th places, at the 5 kilometers race in 1976 and the 10 kilometers race in 1980.

She became Swedish national champion totally eight times.

Cross-country skiing results
All results are sourced from the International Ski Federation (FIS).

Olympic Games

World Championships

World Cup

Season standings

References 

1954 births
Cross-country skiers at the 1976 Winter Olympics
Cross-country skiers at the 1980 Winter Olympics
Living people
Olympic cross-country skiers of Sweden
Swedish female cross-country skiers
20th-century Swedish women